Saint Melania may refer to:
 Saint Melania the Elder
 Saint Melania the Younger